The 2016–17 Niagara Purple Eagles men's basketball team represented Niagara University during the 2016–17 NCAA Division I men's basketball season. The Purple Eagles, led by fourth year head coach Chris Casey, played their home games at the Gallagher Center in Lewiston, New York as members of the Metro Atlantic Athletic Conference. They finished the season 10–23, 6–14 in MAAC play to finish in ninth place. They defeated Quinnipiac in the first round of the MAAC tournament to advance to the quarterfinals where they lost to Monmouth.

Previous season 
The Purple Eagles finished the 2015–16 season 7–25, 5–15 in MAAC play to finish in tenth place. They lost in the first round of the MAAC tournament to Canisius.

Roster

Schedule and results

|-
!colspan=9 style=| Regular season

|-
!colspan=9 style=| MAAC tournament

References

Niagara Purple Eagles men's basketball seasons
Niagara